The Wind is the twelfth and final studio album by American singer-songwriter Warren Zevon. The album was released on August 26, 2003, by Artemis Records. Zevon began recording the album shortly after he was diagnosed with inoperable pleural mesothelioma (a cancer of the lining of the lung), and it was released just two weeks before his death on September 7, 2003. The album was awarded the Grammy Award for Best Contemporary Folk Album, and "Disorder in the House", performed by Zevon with Bruce Springsteen, won the Grammy for Best Rock Vocal Performance (Group or Duo). Songs from the album were nominated for an additional three Grammys.

Recording and release
Upon learning of his cancer diagnosis, Zevon determined to record a final studio album. His record label gave him a large budget to record, and he got assistance from several high-profile musicians and friends. Zevon was inspired to include a Bob Dylan cover after Dylan performed several of his songs in concert in 2002.

Critical reception 
The record was regarded by Robert Christgau as "one of those nearness-of-death albums", along with Mississippi John Hurt's Last Sessions (1972), Bob Dylan's Time Out of Mind (1997), Neil Young's Prairie Wind (2005), and Johnny Cash's American VI: Ain't No Grave (2010).

Track listing

Personnel
Adapted credits from the liner notes of The Wind.

"Dirty Life and Times"
Warren Zevon – vocals and acoustic guitar
Ry Cooder – guitar
Jorge Calderón – bass guitar
Don Henley – drums
Billy Bob Thornton – backing vocals
Dwight Yoakam – backing vocals

"Disorder in the House"
Warren Zevon – vocals
Jorge Calderón – bass guitar, acoustic guitar and percussion
Jim Keltner – drums
Bruce Springsteen – electric guitar and backing vocals

"Knockin' on Heaven's Door"
Warren Zevon – vocals
Jorge Calderón – backing vocals, bass
Brad Davis – electric guitar and backing vocals
Steve Gorman – drums
Randy Mitchell – slide guitar and backing vocals
Tommy Shaw – 12-string acoustic guitar and backing vocals
Billy Bob Thornton – backing vocals
John Waite – backing vocals

"Numb as a Statue"
Warren Zevon – vocals and piano
Jorge Calderón – bass guitar, maracas and backing vocals
Jim Keltner – drums
David Lindley – lap steel guitar

"She's Too Good for Me"
Warren Zevon – vocals and acoustic guitar
Jorge Calderon – bass guitar
Luis Conte – drums and percussion
Don Henley – backing vocals
Timothy B. Schmit – backing vocals

"Prison Grove"
Warren Zevon – vocals
Ry Cooder – slide guitar
David Lindley – electric saz and backing vocals
Jorge Calderon – electric guitar and backing vocals
Reggie Hamilton – upright bass
Jim Keltner – drums
Jordan Zevon – backing vocals
Bruce Springsteen – backing vocals
Jackson Browne – backing vocals
Billy Bob Thornton – backing vocals
T Bone Burnett – backing vocals

"El Amor de Mi Vida"
Warren Zevon – vocals
Jorge Calderón – Spanish-language vocals
Luis Conte – bongos
Reggie Hamilton – upright bass
Jim Keltner – drums
James Raymond – piano

"The Rest of the Night"
Warren Zevon – vocals and electric guitar
Mike Campbell – electric guitar
Jorge Calderón – bass guitar and electric guitar
Luis Conte – drums and percussion
Tom Petty – backing vocals

"Please Stay"
Warren Zevon – vocals and keyboard
Gil Bernal – saxophone
Jorge Calderón – bass guitar
Luis Conte – drums and percussion
Emmylou Harris – backing vocals

"Rub Me Raw"
Warren Zevon – vocals
Jorge Calderón – electric guitar and bass guitar
Jim Keltner – drums
Joe Walsh – slide guitar

"Keep Me in Your Heart"
Warren Zevon – vocals
Jorge Calderón – acoustic guitar, bass guitar and tres
Jim Keltner – drums

Technical personnel
Bridgette Barr – executive Record producer
Hugh Brown – art direction
Jorge Calderón – production
Steve Churchyard – engineering
Greg Hayes – engineering
Stephen Marcussen – mastering
James Mitchell – engineering
Matthew Rolston – cover photo
Noah Scot Snyder – engineering, mixing, production
Joe West – engineering
Jordan Zevon – executive production
Warren Zevon – production

Chart performance

Awards
Grammy Awards

Grammy Award Nominations

References

2003 albums
Warren Zevon albums
Folk rock albums by American artists
Grammy Award for Best Contemporary Folk Album
Artemis Records albums
Rykodisc albums
Concept albums